Rima Taha (born March 22, 1987, in Amman) is a Jordanian sprinter.  She competed in the 100 metres competition at the 2012 Summer Olympics; she ran the preliminaries in 12.66 seconds, her personal best time, which did not qualify her for Round 1.

References

1987 births
Living people
Sportspeople from Amman
Jordanian female sprinters
Female long jumpers
Olympic athletes of Jordan
Athletes (track and field) at the 2012 Summer Olympics
Athletes (track and field) at the 2006 Asian Games
World Athletics Championships athletes for Jordan
Jordanian long jumpers
Asian Games competitors for Jordan
21st-century Jordanian women